In Western classical music, a minor sixth is a musical interval encompassing six staff positions (see Interval number for more details), and is one of two commonly occurring sixths (the other one being the major sixth). It is qualified as minor because it is the smaller of the two: the minor sixth spans eight semitones, the major sixth nine. For example, the interval from A to F is a minor sixth, as the note F lies eight semitones above A, and there are six staff positions from A to F. Diminished and augmented sixths span the same number of staff positions, but consist of a different number of semitones (seven and ten respectively).

Equal temperament
In 12-tone equal temperament (12-ET), the minor sixth is enharmonically equivalent to the augmented fifth. It occurs in first inversion major and dominant seventh chords and second inversion minor chords. It is equal to eight semitones, i.e. a ratio of 28/12:1 or simplified to 22/3:1 (about 1.587), or 800 cents.

Just temperament

Definition
In just intonation multiple definitions of a minor sixth can exist:
In 3-limit tuning, i.e. Pythagorean tuning, the minor sixth is the ratio 128:81, or 792.18 cents, i.e. 7.82 cents flatter than the 12-ET-minor sixth. This is denoted with a "-" (minus) sign (see figure).

In 5-limit tuning, a minor sixth most often corresponds to a pitch ratio of 8:5 or 814 cents; i.e. 13.7 cents sharper than the 12-ET-minor sixth. 

In 11-limit tuning, the 11:7 undecimal minor sixth is 782.49 cents.

Consonance
The minor sixth is one of consonances of common practice music, along with the unison, octave, perfect fifth, major and minor thirds, major sixth and (sometimes) the perfect fourth. In the common practice period, sixths were considered interesting and dynamic consonances along with their inverses the thirds, but in medieval times they were considered dissonances unusable in a stable final sonority. In that period they were tuned to the flatter Pythagorean minor sixth of 128:81. In 5-limit just intonation, the minor sixth of 8:5 is classed as a consonance.

Any note will only appear in major scales from any of its minor sixth major scale notes (for example, C is the minor sixth note from E and E will only appear in C, D, E, F, G, A and B major scales).

Subminor sixth

In addition, the subminor sixth, is a subminor interval which includes ratios such as 14:9 and 63:40. of 764.9 cents or 786.4 cents respectively.

See also
 Musical tuning
 List of meantone intervals
 Sixth chord
 833 cents scale (golden ratio = 833.09 cents)

References

Minor intervals
Sixths (music)